Davide Bagnacani (born 8 January 1980) is an Italian former footballer, who played as a goalkeeper.

Career

Early career & false accounting scandal
Born in Reggio Emilia, Bagnacani started his career at Reggiana. In 1999–2000 season, he left for Serie A side Piacenza, in the first season at Flavio Roma's backup along with Michele Nicoletti and Matteo Giovagnoli. On 29 June 2002, one day before the end of 2001–02 fiscal year, along with team-mate Stefano Di Fiordo were exchanged with Roma's Primavera youth team keeper Simone Paoletti and Alfredo Vitolo in co-ownership deal for €4.5Million, which later suspected to be an irregular deal to gain false profit by inflated the nominal price. That season Roma gained €55 million by exchanged their youth players with inflated price but almost all €55million were in terms of registration rights of other team's youth products. AS Roma was finally fined €60,000 by Criminal Court of Rome on 30 October 2007 for irregularity on youth player transfers.

Roma & Piacenza
Bagnacani was immediately loaned to Serie C2 side Castel di Sangro which he played as first choice. In June 2003, he was bought back by Piacenza along with Di Fiordo for undisclosed fees and Roma bought back Paoletti and Vitolo for just €1,000. He became Matteo Guardalben and Paolo Orlandoni's backup in 2003–04 season. He played the last match of the season on 12 June 2004 and backup by Marco Serena. The match ended in 4–4 draw with Genoa.

Reggiana
In 2005, he left for hometown club Reggiana at Serie C2, as Raffaele Nuzzo's backup. He was offered a new 1-year contract in July 2006. The club lost in the promotion playoffs in 2007, Bagnacani and Nuzzo were retired and replaced by Marco Ambrosio and Luca Tomasig.

International career
Bagnacani was played for Italy at youth levels. He played for Italy U18 team at 1999 UEFA European Under-18 Football Championship as first choice and lost to Portugal U18 team in the finals. (Now a U19 event)

References

External links
 
 Profile at FIGC 

Italian footballers
Italy youth international footballers
Serie B players
A.C. Reggiana 1919 players
Piacenza Calcio 1919 players
Association football goalkeepers
Sportspeople from Reggio Emilia
1980 births
Living people
Footballers from Emilia-Romagna